The 1949 Hardin Indians football team was an American football team that represented Hardin College—now known as Midwestern State University–as a member of the Gulf Coast Conference (GCC) during the 1949 college football season. Led by second-year head coach Billy Stamps, the Indians compiled an overall record of 10–1 with a mark of 3–0 in conference play, winning the GCC title.

Schedule

References

Hardin
Midwestern State Mustangs football seasons
Hardin Indians football